The Palau grenadier (Ventrifossa macroptera) is a species of rattail. This is a deep-water fish found at depths of up to 710 m. It has been recorded from many parts of the Pacific Ocean including Hawaii, southern Japan, Palau and northern Taiwan.

This species is rather similar to many of its congeners and is best distinguished by a combination of morphometric characters. It has a fairly distinctive black pattern on its head and a uniformly dark first dorsal fin (although this latter is not a unique trait).

References
A new species, Caelorinchus sheni, and 19 new records of grenadiers (Pisces: Gadiformes: Macrouridae) from Taiwan - CHIOU Mei-Luen ; SHAO Kwang-Tsao ; IWAMOTO Tomio

Macrouridae
Fish of Palau
Fish described in 1982